Griffin Castillo is a fictional character from the ABC and The Online Network soap opera All My Children. The character debuted on November 16, 2010, and was portrayed by Jordi Vilasuso.

Storylines
Griffin Castillo first appeared at Pine Valley Hospital and immediately began flirting with the married Amanda Martin and helped her repair her husband's car. He also assisted Opal Cortlandt after a heart related problem where he was revealed to be a Cardiologist. Later that day, Griffin is punched by Jake Martin, who reveals that Griffin is the man that stole his former wife Cara Finn, when all three had been involved in Doctors Without Borders. It was revealed on December 16, 2010, that Cara is actually Griffin's sister.

Griffin goes to find Zach Slater, who called him to town to help expand the Miranda Center, but when he goes to Zach's house, his wife Kendall, tells him Zach has died in plane crash. Griffin saved his mentor Dr. David Hayward's life when he was admitted with a gunshot wound. Later, Dr. Angie Hubbard offered Griffin a job working at Pine Valley Hospital due to being short-staffed, Griffin accepted.

Cara is revealed to be traveling on a fake passport, and ends up getting detained by Immigration. Later, Jake's brother, Tad, steps up to help her by saying Cara is his fiancée. Griffin goes along with the ruse to save Cara, keeping their mother, Leticia, at bay so that she can't stop the wedding. Later, he tells Jake to help Cara get a full-time job at the hospital to establish the cover of her marriage.

Griffin finds out Kendall thinks Zach was murdered by his casino partners, and wants to help her out. He later realizes that Reverend Ricky Torres is trying to win over Kendall, and tries to be light about it. Griffin saves Kendall's life when he has to perform heart surgery on her in the back of an ambulance, and confides to her that he has been taking drugs from the hospital to give to clinics around the world that need the medicine. When he tries to investigate the casino partners on his own, he ends up getting beaten and lies to Kendall about it.

Trying to save Kendall's life, Griffin tries to keep her at a distance, but Kendall is persistent, bidding at a bachelor auction for a date with him and even inviting him to her mother's wedding as her date. However, Griffin finds himself a target when Zach's partner, Diana Holden, is found dead in his room with evidence suggesting he was planning to leave town with her. Griffin insists he's innocent, but Kendall tells the police that Griffin stole drugs from the hospital, and he ends up in jail. While in lock-up, he is stabbed by a "guard," and taken to the hospital. Cara gets Jake to lie about his diagnosis so that he won't go back to jail. However, when the lie is revealed, Griffin confesses to protect Cara.

Before he can go back, Kendall helps him escape through a diversion Cara creates. She admits that she turned him in because she wanted answers about Zach's death, but realizes it has nothing to do with him, and she also knows who is responsible: Reverend Ricky Torres. Griffin is upset that Kendall is staying close to him to get a confession, and tries to convince her to stay away. She refuses, saying she needs answers. Griffin later tells Kendall's friend, Ryan Lavery, to keep an eye on her. Ryan, in turn, arranges a private jet to take Griffin anywhere he wants. However, Griffin decides to stay in town, because he's not ready to leave Kendall or risk her going up against Ricky.

With help from Tad, Griffin evades the police and tracks Kendall and Ricky down to a yacht they had earlier taken out, where Kendall has just tricked Ricky into confessing that he is Zach's killer. In the ensuing skirmish, Griffin incapacitates Ricky but is talked out of killing him by Kendall, and Jesse arrives at that moment, first to arrest Ricky for kidnapping Kendall's younger sister, Bianca Montgomery, and her friend, Marissa Chandler, and then to arrest Griffin himself. Though Kendall begs him not to, Griffin goes with Jesse without a fight, promising Kendall that everything will work out.

On September 12, 2011, it revealed that Griffin is alive and was working with Zach, Ryan, Greenlee, Kendall and Cara to bring David down.

External links
All My Children - Griffin Castillo

All My Children characters
Fictional physicians
Fictional characters from Pennsylvania
Television characters introduced in 2010
Male characters in television